Hamza Elias (born 5 May 1993) is a Ghanaian association football midfielder.

Club career
Between 2009 and 2012, Elias played for Kessben F.C., later renamed Medeama SC,  of the Ghana Premier League, the top division of professional football in Ghana, before playing one season in the second division with FC Platini Kumasi for the 2012–2013 season.

On 15 January 2014, it was announced that Elias had signed a 1-year contract with Canadian club Ottawa Fury FC of the North American Soccer League after being discovered by scouts at a combine also attended by scouts from Monaco, Braga, and Porto. The Fury released Elias on July 9, 2014. Elias appeared in only four matches for the Ottawa club and accumulated three yellow cards.

Since 2018, Elias has played for National Premier Soccer League side Club Atletico Saint Louis.

International career
In 2007, Elias was called up to the Ghana national under-17 football team.

References

External links
 Ottawa Fury FC Profile

1993 births
Living people
Ghanaian footballers
Ghanaian expatriate footballers
Association football midfielders
Expatriate soccer players in Canada
Ghanaian expatriate sportspeople in Canada
Ottawa Fury FC players
North American Soccer League players
National Premier Soccer League players